"I Can Love You Better" is a song written by Pamela Brown Hayes and Kostas, and recorded by American country music group Dixie Chicks. It was released in October 1997 as their debut single and the first from their album Wide Open Spaces, and was the first hit of the Natalie Maines era of the group.

The song reached number 7 on the Billboard magazine Hot Country Singles & Tracks, and represented the group's first real commercial success.  The song was included in the set list on the Chicks' 2000 Fly Tour, but was not performed again until the 2013 Long Time Gone Tour. The Dixie Chicks performed a parody of the song, "No Letter Better Than B", on Sesame Street.

Content
The song's narrator is assuring a man that she can love him better and make him forget his previous love.

Critical reception
Stephen Thomas Erlewine cited the track as "convincing" in his review of the album for Allmusic.

Music video
The music video for "I Can Love You Better" was directed by Chris Rogers. In it, the Dixie Chicks are shown performing the song while in an airport lobby. They are also shown sitting on an airport baggage claim belt, in a bakery, and on a crowded sidewalk.

Chart performance

Year-end charts

References

1997 debut singles
1997 songs
The Chicks songs
Songs written by Kostas (songwriter)
Song recordings produced by Blake Chancey
Song recordings produced by Paul Worley
Monument Records singles